The Combatant Clergy Association is a politically active group in Iran, but not a political party in the traditional sense.

It has never been registered as a political party; however, it acts as a fragmented caucus and has actively operated in the electoral arena, competing for votes. Thus, it is considered an elite party and can be classified as a political party according to the minimalist definition by Angelo Panebianco. The traditional conservative clerical association was the majority party in the fourth and fifth parliaments after the Islamic revolution.

The organization has great influence over non-elective institutions such as the Judicial system, the Guardian Council and Revolutionary Guard Corps.

History
After the 15 Khordad demonstration failed in Iran, it was felt that a coherence organization was needed. The association was founded in 1977 by a group of clerics with intentions to use Islamic culture and traditions to overthrow the Shah. Although the exact founding members of the group are unsure, some of them were said to be Ali Khamenei, Morteza Motahhari, Mohammad Beheshti, Mohammad Javad Bahonar, Akbar Hashemi Rafsanjani, Fazlollah Mahallati, and Mohammad Mofatteh, and its current members include founding member Ali Khamenei.

The Combatant Clergy Association was one of the few republican groups active before the Iran–Iraq War. A "free political atmosphere" was not provided in Iran due to the special conditions of wartime, and the Combatant Clergy Association was the only active political organisation after the dissolution of the Islamic Republican Party (All IRP clerics were members of CCA but not all CCA founders were members of IRP). By the emergence of factional differences in government of Mir Hossein Mousavi, the organization was divided, and Association of Combatant Clerics was formed.

Recent years 
CCA is suffering from unresolved contention between its elites. Hassan Rouhani, president of Iran since 2013, is a member of the faction although he has been inactive and not participated their regular sessions since the disputed 2009 presidential elections, a situation that applies to Ali Akbar Nategh-Nouri and Akbar Hashemi Rafsanjani as well. The association however backed Rafsanjani and Rouhani in 2016 Assembly of Experts election and included both on its list, despite backing Rouhani's rival, Ebrahim Raisi, for president in 2017.

Goals and activities
The association brought together anti-Shah clerics and bazaaris. It also aimed to preserve the revolution and its achievements. Supporting the Guardianship of the Islamic Jurist and state organization are some of the group's goals. The association does not recognize itself as a political party and hence does not have any written strategy or policy. The association mostly announces its political viewpoints around election time.

Members of the association have had important positions in the different governments of Iran. By 2004, four out of eight presidents of the executive branch of the government had been selected from this association. Also, the president of the judicial branch of the government was one of the members of the association, Ayatollah Mohammad Yazdi, for two five-year periods, from 1989 to 1999.

Foreign policy
The association believes in making diplomatic relationships with all world countries except the United States and Israel, and their criteria in this regard is avoiding both being dominated by other countries and domination over others. However, they believe that there can be relationships with France and the United Kingdom under defined conditions. The association believes that there are intrinsic differences between the value system of Iran and western societies.

Funding
The fourth chapter of the Combatant Clergy Association's statute deals with the financial issues of the association.

Election results

Assembly of Experts

List of General Secretaries

References

1977 establishments in Iran
Principlist political groups in Iran
Political parties established in 1977
Iranian clerical political groups
Political parties of the Iranian Revolution
Anti-Americanism
Khomeinist groups